Maria Stuart is a biography of Mary, Queen of Scots, written by Stefan Zweig and published in 1935. It is presented as a tragedy (Dramatis personae at the head of the book). It was translated to English, albeit with radical changes, by husband and wife Eden and Cedar Paul in 1936.

Content 

The biography consists of 23 chapters and an epilogue:
 Queen in the cradle (1542-1548)
 Youth in France (1548-1555)
 Queen, widow and queen again (July 1560-August 1561)
 Return to Scotland (August 1561)
 First warning (1561-1563)
 Large political marriage market (1563-1565)
 Second marriage (1565)
 The dramatic night of Holyrood (March 9, 1566)
 The betrayed felons (March–June 1566)
 Terrible complication (July to Christmas 1566)
 Tragedy of a passion (1566-1567)
 The Way of Murder (January 22-February 9, 1567)
 Quos deus perdere vult (February–April 1567)
 The dead end (April–June 1567)
 The dismissal (Summer 1567)
 Farewell to freedom (Summer 1567-summer 1568)
 A plot is going on (May 16-June 28, 1568)
 The net tightens (July 1568-January 1569)
 The years in the shade (1569-1584)
 The knife war (1584-1585)
 We must finish (September 1585 – 1586)
 Elisabeth against Elisabeth (August 1586-February 1587)
 "At my end is my beginning" (February 8, 1587)

References 

Works by Stefan Zweig
Cultural depictions of Mary, Queen of Scots
Biographies (books)